The Democracy Collaborative is a 501(c)(3) non-profit, American think tank and research center founded at the University of Maryland in 2000. It is based in Washington, D.C., and Cleveland, Ohio, and researches strategies to address income inequality, and to contribute to community wealth building and environmental and social sustainability.

Projects

Community-Wealth.org
Community-Wealth.org is a Democracy Collaborative project that seeks to facilitate conversation and creation of more equitable wealth distribution in American communities.

The Next System Project
The Democracy Collaborative's website calls the Next System Project "an ambitious multi-year initiative aimed at thinking boldly about what is required to deal with the systemic challenges the United States faces now and in coming decades."

Fifty by Fifty
Fifty by Fifty is an initiative that seeks to expand employee ownership in the United States. The Democracy Collaborative initiative hopes to help create 50 million employee owners by the year 2050.

People
Marjorie Kelly, Director of Special Projects, Distinguished Senior Fellow, cofounder of Business Ethics magazine.

References

External links 

 Official website

Political and economic think tanks in the United States
501(c)(3) organizations
Organizations established in 2000